The Nicholls Soccer Complex is a soccer facility located on the campus of Nicholls State University in Thibodaux, United States. It serves as the home of the Nicholls Colonels women's soccer team. The stadium has a seating capacity of 1,000.

In 2012, the soccer stadium received a complete renovation which including locker rooms, a team area, offices, new press box and a concession area.

Gallery

See also
Nicholls Colonels women's soccer
List of soccer stadiums in the United States

References

External links
Nicholls Soccer Complex

College soccer venues in the United States
Nicholls Colonels women's soccer venues
Soccer venues in Louisiana
Sports venues in Thibodaux, Louisiana
Buildings and structures in Lafourche Parish, Louisiana
Sports venues completed in 1998
1998 establishments in Louisiana